Isnos is a town and municipality in the Huila Department, Colombia. This region was struck with a M7.3 earthquake on 30 September 2012. Isnos was recognized and declared by UNESCO in 1995 as a Cultural and Historical Heritage.

References

Municipalities of Huila Department